Tandem Press  is an independent publisher based in Auckland, New Zealand founded in 1990. It specializes in New Zealand fiction and non-fiction. It published Alan Duff's Once Were Warriors.

Sources
The New Zealand Writer's Handbook
Writers & Artists' Yearbook

External links
Tandem Press at booksellers.co.nz

Book publishing companies of New Zealand